Jerry Tamashiro (born 18 March 1971) is a former Peruvian-Japanese footballer who played as a forward.

Career statistics

Club

Notes

References

External links

 Jerry Tamashiro Interview

1971 births
Living people
Peruvian footballers
Peru youth international footballers
Association football forwards
Major League Soccer players
Club Universitario de Deportes footballers
Carlos A. Mannucci players
Deportivo Municipal footballers
Club Alianza Lima footballers
Miami Fusion players
Juan Aurich footballers
Deportivo Coopsol players
Footballers from Lima
Peruvian people of Japanese descent